Balurghat (pron:bʌlʊəˈgɑ:t) is a city and a municipality in the state of West Bengal, India. It is the district headquarter of the Dakshin Dinajpur district. It is one of the major cities connected through National Highway 512. In this town there are museum, parks, super speciality hospital, govt. offices, district court, schools, colleges, a university, police station, railway station, hotels, restaurants, cinema halls, temples, mosques, churches, etc. There is the Atreyee river which flows through this town. It is a place/town to live peacefully. It is a place to visit in the month of October to November when one can enjoy ritualistic and religious festivals. From the inner area of Balurghat one can go Hilli, a rural area, where one can see India-Bangladesh border.

Geography

Location
It has an average elevation of 25 metres (82 feet).

River Atreyee runs across the city, dividing it into disproportionate halves. The heart of the city, with important administrative, cultural and entertainment hubs, is on the eastern bank of the river. India-Bangladesh border is approximately 3 km from the town.

In the map alongside, all places marked on the map are linked in the full screen version.

Police stations
Balurghat police station under West Bengal police has jurisdiction over Balurghat municipal area and Balurghat CD Block.

Balurghat Women police station has jurisdiction over Balurghat subdivision.

Subdivision and CD block HQ
Balurghat subdivision has its headquarters at Balurghat.

The headquarters of Balurghat CD block is at Balurghat.

Climate

Demographics

In the 2011 census, Balurghat municipality had a population of 153279, of which 76730 were males and 76549 were females. The Balurghat urban agglomeration had a population of 164,593, out of which 82,466 were males and 82,127 were females. The 0–6 years population was 10,349. Effective literacy rate for the 7+ population was 91.66 per cent.

 India census, Balurghat municipality had a population of 151,416, of which 75,794 were males and 75,622 were females. Balurghat has an average literacy rate of 84.8%, with 87% of the males and 82.5% of females literate. Population in the age range of 0 to 6 years is 10,677. The Scheduled Castes and Scheduled Tribes have a population of 15,204 and 3,008 respectively. Balurghat had 37507 households in 2011.

98.7% of the population are Hindus, with small percentages (below 1%) of Muslims and Sikhs.

Economics
Balurghat is a distribution centre in northern West Bengal. The main goods traded include rice, jute, sugar cane, fisheries and oilseeds.

Transport

Balurghat Railway Station is the terminus station of the Eklakhi–Balurghat branch line
Trains connecting Balurghat to Kolkata directly include Gour Express, Tebhaga Express and Howrah-Balurghat Express. Train services also connect Balurghat to Siliguri in the north through Balurghat-Siliguri Intercity Express. Balurghat is also connected to Malda through Balurghat-Malda Court Passenger Train. Besides, Balurghat - Nabadwip Dham Express connects Nabadwip with Balurghat.

Indian National Highway 512 passes through Balurghat (from Gazole To Hili).

At Balurghat, there is a Government (NBSTC) bus and Public bus stand. Many buses (both NBSTC & Private) runs from Balurghat to Kolkata, Siliguri, Coochbehar, Kalna, Durgapur, Malda, Raiganj etc.
Balurghat Airport is situated at the entrance of the town, at Mahinagar. A Kolkata-Malda-Balurghat-Coochbehar flight service has been planned for this airport. Previously, there was a Kolkata-Malda-Balurghat helicopter service for some years.

Education

Schools
 Atreyee D. A. V. Public School
  Balurghat Girls' High School
 Balurghat High School
 Balurghat Khadimpur High School
 Balurghat Techno India Group Public School
 Jawahar Navodaya Vidyalaya, Dakshin Dinajpur
 Kendriya Vidyalaya, Balurghat

Colleges
 Balurghat College
 Balurghat Mahila Mahavidyalaya
 Balurghat Law College
 Jamini Majumdar Memorial College
 Uttar Banga Krishi Viswavidyalaya (Majhian Campus)

Universities
 Dakshin Dinajpur University

Festivals
Durga Puja, Kali Puja, Chhath Puja, Rath Yatra, Biswakarma Puja, Ganesh Chaturthi and Saraswati puja are widely celebrated at Balurghat. Bolla Kali Puja is celebrated at Bolla, approximately 15 kilometres (9 miles) from Balurghat, in late November each year.

Sports
Balurghat is also home to district's 1st ever stadium to host the top tier national level cricket match like a Ranji Trophy Match. Balurghat Stadium is a multi-purpose stadium used for sports like cricket and football. An indoor sports complex in Balurghat is also in under construction.

Healthcare
Balurghat General Hospital (District Hospital) has 600 beds
Balurghat Police Hospital has 50 beds
Balurghat Poura Hospital and Matri Sadan has 32 beds
Balurghat Super Specialty Hospital

See also
Balurghat High School
Balurghat Airport
Atreyee DAV Public School

References

External links
 
 
 
 

 
Cities and towns in Dakshin Dinajpur district
Cities in West Bengal